Bulbophyllum sect. Napelli is a section of the genus Bulbophyllum. It is one of six Bulbophyllum sections found in the Americas.

Description
Species in this section have unifoliate pseudobulbs, inflorescence with a thin rachis holding flowers that are distichously arranged. Lateral sepals totally free, petals erect.  Column foot  with entire apex and shorter than the length of the column.

Distribution
Plants from this section are found in Brazil, Argentina, and  Venezuela.

Species
Bulbophyllum section Napelli comprises the following species:

References

Orchid subgenera